There are several rivers named Guandu River Brazil.

 Guandu River (Espírito Santo)
 Guandu River (Paraíba)
 Guandu River (Rio de Janeiro)
 Guandu-Mirim River

See also
 Guandu (disambiguation)